Stuart Whittaker (born 2 January 1975) is an English former professional footballer who played in The Football League for Bolton Wanderers, Wigan Athletic, Macclesfield Town, Chester City and Nuneaton Borough.

References

1975 births
Living people
Footballers from Liverpool
Association football midfielders
English footballers
Liverpool F.C. players
Bolton Wanderers F.C. players
Wigan Athletic F.C. players
Macclesfield Town F.C. players
Southport F.C. players
Chester City F.C. players
Leigh Genesis F.C. players
Nuneaton Borough F.C. players
Vauxhall Motors F.C. players
Stafford Rangers F.C. players
English Football League players